The Carroll County Courthouse in Carrollton, Georgia was built in 1928.  It was listed on the National Register of Historic Places in 1980.

It is located at Newnan and Dixie Streets in Carrollton.

It was designed by architect William J.J. Chase and was built by the Carr Construction Co.

References

County courthouses in Georgia (U.S. state)
National Register of Historic Places in Carroll County, Georgia

Beaux-Arts architecture in Georgia (U.S. state)
Government buildings completed in 1928
1928 establishments in Georgia (U.S. state)